RFA Reliant (A84) was an air stores support ship of the Royal Fleet Auxiliary. She was formerly the commercial general cargo vessel Somersby which was purchased in 1956 and renamed on completion of her conversion in 1958. She was fitted for replenishing aircraft carriers at sea with a wide range of air, naval and victualling stores.
As refitted she had a helicopter landing pad built over the poop deckhouse.

References

Ships of the Royal Fleet Auxiliary
1953 ships